Bleu de France (Blue of France) is a colour traditionally used to represent France. Blue has been used in the heraldry of the French monarchy since at least the 12th century, with the golden fleurs-de-lis of the kings always set on a blue (heraldic "azure") background. A brighter version, based on the blue of the French Tricolour, is used in modern times, particularly in a sporting context. French national teams in all sports will normally use blue as their main colour.

Blue is France's national racing colour; therefore, several French motorsport teams have used it, including Alpine, Amilcar, Ballot, Bugatti, Delage, Delahaye, Gordini, Ligier, Mathis, Matra, Panhard, Pescarolo Sport, Peugeot, Prost Grand Prix, Rondeau, Salmson, Talbot-Lago, Voisin. The two notable exceptions are Citroën and Renault: the former has used red and white, whereas the latter has used yellow and black. Between  and  Renault F1 cars ran a blue colour not as the national racing colour of France but due to the team's title sponsor the Japanese cigarette brand Mild Seven. Blue de France appeared on the Enstone team's car again for the 2021 season, when the team rebranded to Alpine F1 Team, continuing the Alpine marque's association with the colour across motorsport.

"French blue" has also been in use by the Massachusetts State Police, in uniform and livery, since June 1933, to render troopers immediately recognizable to the public. Since 1944 it has also been in use by Delaware State Police on their uniforms.

Race cars in Bleu de France

See also
 List of colors
 List of international auto racing colours

References 

National symbols of France
Shades of azure
Shades of blue
Bird colours